Mai Fujii (藤井 舞 Fujii Mai, born 12 April 1989) is a Japanese volleyball player who plays for Denso Airybees.

Profiles

Clubs
Kyushubunka High School → Denso Airybees (2008-)

National team
 2008 - 1st AVC Women's Cup

Honors
Team
Japan Volleyball League/V.League/V.Premier　Runners-up (1): 2007-2008
Kurowashiki All Japan Volleyball Championship　Champions (1): 2008

References

External links
JVA Biography
Denso Official Website Profile

1989 births
Living people
Japanese women's volleyball players
Sportspeople from Kitakyushu